Timepoint may refer to:

 Timing point, a public transit stop with a scheduled departure time
 Time point, a concept in music
 A fictional prison for time travelers, created by Epoch, a character in the DC comics universe